Marielund is an estate with a manor house located in Nättraby, Karlskrona Municipality in Blekinge County, Sweden. The estate dates back to the 1600s. It was purchased in 1746 by nobleman Adam Johan Raab (1703-1776) who was the Governor of Kronoberg.

References

Buildings and structures in Blekinge County
Manor houses in Sweden